The 2016 Campeonato Paranaense was the 101st season of Paraná's top professional football league. The competition began on January 30 and ends in May.

Format
The tournament consists of a double round-robin format, in which all twelve teams play each other twice.

The top eight sides after all games have been played will advance to the final stages.

Participating teams

League table

References

Campeonato Paranaense
Paranaense